Francisco Bores (Madrid, May 6, 1898 - Paris, May 10, 1972) was an important figure of twentieth-century European art. His presence was fundamental in the second wave of Spanish artists who arrived in Paris in the 1920s, in which he included Pablo Picasso, Ginés Parra, Pedro Flores, Antoni Clavé; although in his own country he was not really recognized until well into the 1970s when aspects of Art that did not fit in with the dominant informalism and social realism were finally valued.  

The style of Bores was forged following his close contact with the greatest painters of the first Vanguard: Pablo Picasso and Henri Matisse. He admired his manner of constructing forms, his classicism, and later his cubist explosion. Bores harmonizes both of these influences in his work, and goes beyond them. His artworks are showcased at the Museo de Arte Contemporáneo in Madrid.

References

External links 
 Bores in the Telefonica Collection
 Francisco Bores, a master of contemporary art

1898 births
1972 deaths
Spanish artists
Spanish emigrants to France